Nakas may refer to:

People
Audrius Nakas (born 1967), Lithuanian politician
Kęstutis Nakas (born 1953), American playwright, author, performer, director, and teacher
Nikolaos Nakas (born 1982), German footballer
Šarūnas Nakas (born 1962), Lithuanian composer, essayist, curator, filmmaker, and broadcaster
Stelios Nakas (born 1994), Greek footballer

Places
Nakas (mountain), highest point of Orenburg Oblast, Russia
Nakas (river), a river in Bashkortostan, Russia